John "Johnny" C. Gibbons (died 20 May 2021) was a Palauan politician. He was the Executive Administrator of Koror from 1985–1997 and then became the first Governor of Koror from 1998–2006. He was the Minister of Justice from 2009–2013. He died on 20 May 2021 and is survived by his wife Dirioulidid Ruth Gibbons, his two children and grandchildren. A state funeral was held for him on 3 June 2021.

References

2021 deaths
Executive Administrators of Koror
Governors of Koror
People from Koror
Government ministers of Palau
Justice Ministers of Palau